Joanne Gwendoline "Jo" Goode MBE (née Wright; born 17 November 1972) is a former English badminton player. She represented Great Britain at the 1996 and 2000 Olympic Games, and won the 2000 mixed doubles bronze medal with Simon Archer. Goode also won seven gold medals at the Commonwealth Games, a gold at the European Championships, and a silver at the World Championships.

Career 
Goode competed in badminton at the 2000 Summer Olympics in mixed doubles with Simon Archer and won a bronze medal. She also played in women's doubles with Donna Kellogg losing in the quarterfinals against Gao Ling and Qi Yiyuan.

Archer and Goode won gold medals twice at the Commonwealth Games in 1998 and 2002.

Achievements

Olympic Games 
Mixed doubles

World Championships 
Mixed doubles

World Cup 
Women's doubles

Commonwealth Games 
Women's doubles

Mixed doubles

European Championships 
Women's doubles

Mixed doubles

European Junior Championships 
Girls' doubles

Mixed doubles

IBF World Grand Prix
The World Badminton Grand Prix sanctioned by International Badminton Federation (IBF) since 1983.

Women's doubles

Mixed doubles

IBF International 
Women's doubles

Mixed doubles

Personal life 
Joanne Wright married Andy Goode, an English badminton player who managed the British team in badminton at the 1996 Summer Olympics. They have three children named Jack, Molly, and Harry.

Goode was appointed Member of the Order of the British Empire (MBE) in the 2004 Queen's Birthday Honours.

References

External links 
 
 
 

1972 births
Living people
Sportspeople from Harlow
English female badminton players
Badminton players at the 1996 Summer Olympics
Badminton players at the 2000 Summer Olympics
Olympic badminton players of Great Britain
Olympic bronze medallists for Great Britain
Olympic medalists in badminton
Medalists at the 2000 Summer Olympics
Badminton players at the 1994 Commonwealth Games
Badminton players at the 1998 Commonwealth Games
Badminton players at the 2002 Commonwealth Games
Commonwealth Games gold medallists for England
Commonwealth Games bronze medallists for England
Commonwealth Games medallists in badminton
World No. 1 badminton players
Members of the Order of the British Empire
Medallists at the 1994 Commonwealth Games
Medallists at the 1998 Commonwealth Games
Medallists at the 2002 Commonwealth Games